So-yeon, also spelled So-youn or So-yun, is a Korean feminine given name. Its meaning differs based on the hanja used to write each syllable of the name. There are 45 hanja with the reading "so" and 39 hanja with the reading "yeon" on the South Korean government's official list of hanja which may be registered for use in given names. People with this name include:

Entertainers
Kim Ga-yeon (born Kim So-yeon, 1972), South Korean actress and owner of StarCraft II team SlayerS
Kim So-yeon (born 1980), South Korean actress
Lee So-yeon (actress) (born 1983), South Korean actress
Park So-yeon (singer) (born 1987), South Korean singer, member of girl group T-ara
Jeong So-yeon (born 1994), South Korean singer, member of girl groups Laboum and WSG Wannabe
Jeon So-yeon (born 1998), South Korean rapper, singer, songwriter, record producer, and leader of girl group (G)I-dle

Sportspeople
Lee So-yeon (judoka) (born 1981), South Korean judo practitioner
Kim So-yeon (badminton) (born 1982), South Korean badminton player
Ryu So-yeon (born 1990), South Korean golfer
Ji So-yun (born 1991), South Korean footballer
Lee So-yeon (speed skater) (born 1993), South Korean speed skater
Han So-yeon (born 1995), South Korean badminton player
Park So-youn (figure skater) (born 1997), South Korean figure skater

Other
Kim So-yeon (writer) (born 1967), South Korean poet
Kim So-yeon (activist) (born 1970), South Korean trade unionist
Yi So-yeon (born 1978), South Korean astronaut and biotechnologist
Soyeon Kate Lee (born 1979), South Korean-born American pianist
Soyeon Jeong (born 1983), South Korean science fiction writer

See also
List of Korean given names

References

Korean feminine given names